KIKK is a daytime-only station, licensed to Pasadena, Texas, which broadcasts a sports gambling format under ownership of Audacy, Inc. Its studios are located in the Greenway Plaza district of Houston, and its transmitter is located in Pasadena.

History
KIKK commenced operations as radio station KRCT in 1947, licensed to Baytown. The Bay Broadcasting Company was the original owner, having built and operated the station since its inception. Bay Broadcasting would sell KRCT to Industrial Broadcasting Company in 1958, not long after moving it from the original tower site in Baytown, to its current home in Pasadena.

On May 1, 1961, KRCT changed call letters to the current KIKK.

KIKK only operates from local sunrise to local sunset in order to protect clear-channel WSM in Nashville. For a time in the 1960s, Industrial attempted to operate the station earlier than sunrise in Houston and Nashville and begin operations at 6:00 am each day. This was denied at district court and appeals court, and the station's prior operation at such times was sanctioned with a  fine from the Federal Communications Commission.

It simulcasted with its FM sister station at times (the former KIKK-FM, now KKHH), and was part of a heated country war with KILT-AM-FM until 1994.

KIKK changed formats in July 2004 to Hot Talk under the moniker KIKK Ass 650, which became the Houston home for The Howard Stern Show. After Stern's move to Sirius Satellite Radio in December 2005, KIKK switched to a news format and was affiliated with CNN Headline News. Their early evening schedule was composed of Adult Standards music until 2008, when Headline News completely took over the rest of the schedule, but that network's continuous move away from rolling news to focus more on personality talk caused the station to seek other programming such as the Clark Howard Show, which then took up most of the station's schedule. In 2010, the station flipped to a local personality-emphasizing talk format (branded simply as "Talk 650"); however, it switched to an all-syndicated lineup in July 2011.

KIKK dropped its talk format on January 2, 2013, and became a sports radio station affiliated with CBS Sports Radio. The network's national programming complements the locally focused sports format on sister station KILT.

On February 2, 2017, CBS Radio announced it would merge with Entercom. The merger was approved on November 9, 2017, and was consummated on the 17th.

On June 21, 2021, KIKK flipped to sports gambling, branded as "The Bet Houston", with programming from the co-owned BetQL network. CBS Sports Radio programming remains in certain timeslots.

Programming
KIKK begins daily broadcasts at local sunrise (typical of daytime only AMs) but usually is on the air by 6AM Central in most cases. The station carries the entire daytime lineup of the BEtQL Network. It signs off at sunset to protect WSM.

Previous logo

References

External links

IKK
Radio stations established in 1961
1961 establishments in Texas
IKK
Audacy, Inc. radio stations
CBS Sports Radio stations
Sports radio stations in the United States